Coelorrhina is a genus of flower chafers (insects belonging to the subfamily Cetoniinae).

Description
Species included in this genus are quite large, with a metallic gold green colour. The male has a short T-shaped prominence on the forehead.

Distribution 
This genus is widespread in Africa south of Sahara.

List of species
Coelorrhina aurata (Westwood, 1841)
Coelorrhina babaulti Allard, 1983
Coelorrhina hornimani Bates, 1877
Coelorrhina mutica Janson, 1915
Coelorrhina Pythia Kolbe, 1899
Coelorrhina quadrimaculata (Fabricius, 1781)
Coelorrhina ruteri Allard, 1983
Coelorrhina seals Kolbe, 1899

References 
 BioLib -Coelorrhina

Scarabaeidae genera
Cetoniinae